The White Carpathians are a mountain range on the border of the Czech Republic and Slovakia, part of the Carpathians. 

They are part of the Slovak-Moravian Carpathians, stretching from the Váh river and the Little Carpathians in the south along the border between the Czech Republic and Slovakia to the Morava and the Javorníky range in the north. 

The mean elevation is 473 m (1,552 ft) and the highest peaks are:
 Veľká Javorina, 970 m (3,182 ft)
 Chmeľová, 925 m (3,035 ft)
 Jelenec, 925 m (3,035 ft)
 Veľký Lopeník, 911 m (2,989 ft)
 Kobylinec, 911 m (2,989 ft)

The  landscape is protected on both sides of the mountains: Biele Karpaty Protected Landscape Area in Slovakia, founded in 1979, and Bílé Karpaty Protected Landscape Area in the Czech Republic, founded in 1980, a Man and Biosphere Reserve since 1996. The areas contain a wide variety of fauna and flora. Some species found there are endemic, especially some types of orchids which grow only in the meadows of the White Carpathians.

In this area, Lednica Castle is located, perhaps the most inaccessible one amongst the castles in Slovakia. It was built in the middle of the 13th century and it was the seat of the Lednice estate. Austrian imperial troops destroyed it at the beginning of the 18th century. Only the remains of walls survive.

External links
 Bíle Karpaty Protected Landscape Area official website
 Biele Karpaty Protected Landscape Area at Slovakia.travel

Mountain ranges of the Czech Republic
Mountain ranges of Slovakia
Mountain ranges of the Western Carpathians
Biosphere reserves of the Czech Republic